Martin-de-Viviès, or La Roche Godon, formerly Camp Heurtin, is a research station and the only settlement on the Île Amsterdam and Île Saint-Paul islands of the French Southern and Antarctic Lands in the southern Indian Ocean.  It lies on the north coast of Amsterdam Island and houses about thirty people.

It was named after Paul de Martin de Viviès who, with ten others, spent the winter of 1949 on the island.

The station was originally named Camp Heurtin and has been in operation since 1 January 1981, superseding the first station, La Roche Godon.

References

External links
Aerial photograph

French Southern and Antarctic Lands
Île Amsterdam
1981 establishments in Antarctica
Research stations